Earl Francis Lloyd (April 3, 1928 – February 26, 2015) was an American professional basketball player and coach. He was the first African American player to play a game in the National Basketball Association (NBA).

An All–American player at West Virginia State University, Lloyd helped lead West Virginia State to an undefeated season in 1948. As a professional, Lloyd helped lead the Syracuse Nationals to the 1955 NBA Championship. Lloyd was inducted into the Naismith Basketball Hall of Fame in 2003.

Early life
Earl Lloyd was born in Alexandria, Virginia, on April 3, 1928, to Theodore Lloyd, Sr. and Daisy Lloyd. His father worked in the coal industry and his mother was a stay-at-home mom. Being a high school standout, Lloyd was named to the All-South Atlantic Conference three times and the All-State Virginia Interscholastic Conference twice. Lloyd did attend a segregated school, but gives gratitude to his family and educators for helping him through the tough times and his success after school.

Lloyd was a 1946 graduate of Parker–Grey High School, where he played for Coach Louis Randolph Johnson. He received a scholarship to play basketball at West Virginia State University, home of the Yellow Jackets. In school he was nicknamed "Moon Fixer" because of his size and was known as a defensive specialist.

College career
Lloyd led West Virginia State to two Central Intercollegiate Athletic Association (CIAA) Conference and Tournament Championships in 1948 and 1949. He was named All–Conference three times (1948–50) and was All-American twice, as named by the Pittsburgh Courier (1949–50). As a senior, he averaged 14 points and 8 rebounds per game, while leading West Virginia State to a second–place finish in the CIAA Conference and Tournament Championship. In 1947–48, West Virginia State was the only undefeated team in the United States, with a 30–0 record. Lloyd graduated from WVSU with his B.S. degree in physical education in 1950.

NBA career
Lloyd was drafted in the 9th round with pick #100 by the Washington Capitols in the 1950 NBA draft. Nicknamed "The Big Cat", Lloyd was one of three black players to enter the NBA at the same time. It was because of the order in which the team's season openers fell that Lloyd was the first to actually play in a game in the NBA, scoring six points on Halloween night. The date was October 31, 1950, one day ahead of Chuck Cooper of the Boston Celtics and four days before Nat "Sweetwater" Clifton of the New York Knicks.

Lloyd played in over 560 games in nine seasons. The 6-foot-5, 225-pound forward played in only seven games for the Washington Capitols before the team folded on January 9, 1951. He was then drafted into the U.S. Army at Fort Sill, Oklahoma. While fulfilling his military duty, the Syracuse Nationals picked him up on waivers. Lloyd served time fighting in the Korean War before coming back to basketball in 1952. In the 1953–54 season, Lloyd led the NBA in both personal fouls and disqualifications.

In 1954-1955, Lloyd  averaged career highs of 10.2 points and 7.7 rebounds for Syracuse, which beat the Fort Wayne Pistons 4 games to 3 to win the 1955 NBA Championship. Lloyd and Jim Tucker became the first African–Americans to play on an NBA championship team. Lloyd spent six seasons with Syracuse and two with the Detroit Pistons before retiring in 1961.

Regarding the racism black players faced in the early years of the NBA, Lloyd recalled being refused service multiple times and an incident where a fan in Indiana spit on him. However, Lloyd persevered and said that these instances only pushed him and made him play harder. Saying he didn't encounter racial animosity from teammates or opposing players, Lloyd said of fans' antics, “My philosophy was: If they weren’t calling you names, you weren’t doing nothing. If they’re calling you names, you were hurting them.”

"In 1950, basketball was like a babe in the woods; it didn't enjoy the notoriety that baseball enjoyed," Lloyd once said. "I don't think my situation was anything like Jackie Robinson's-a guy who played in a hostile environment, where some of his teammates didn't want him around. In basketball, folks were used to seeing integrated college teams. There was a different mentality."

“He’s an unsung star. Anybody can score. Lloyd was an excellent defensive player. That was No. 1 on my roster,” said his Syracuse Coach Al Cervi.

In his NBA career with the Washington Capitols (1950–1951), Syracuse Nationals (1952–1958) and Detroit Pistons (1958–1960), Earl averaged 8.4 points, 6.4 rebounds and 1.4 assists in 560 games over nine seasons.

Coaching and scouting career
According to Detroit News sportswriter Jerry Green, in 1965 Detroit Pistons General Manager Don Wattrick wanted to hire Lloyd as the team's head coach. Dave DeBusschere was instead named Pistons player–coach. Lloyd was the first African–American assistant coach and was named head coach for the 1971–72 season, making him the third African–American head coach, after John McLendon and Bill Russell. A 2–5 start to the following campaign resulted in Lloyd being relieved of his duties and replaced by assistant coach Ray Scott on October 28, 1972. He had an overall record of 22–55 with the Pistons.

Lloyd worked for the Pistons as a scout for five seasons. Lloyd is credited with helping draft Bailey Howell and discovering Willis Reed, Earl Monroe, Ray Scott and Wally Jones.

Personal life
After his basketball career, Lloyd worked during the 1970s and 1980s as a job placement administrator for the Detroit public school system. During this time, Lloyd also ran programs for underprivileged children teaching job skills.

Lloyd served as Community Relations Director for the Bing Group, a Detroit manufacturing company in the 1990s.

Approached by a young African–American player who said he was indebted to Lloyd for opening the doors for future generations of black players,  Lloyd replied that he owed him absolutely nothing.

“You cannot understand what an honor this is,” Lloyd said in 2007 about the court at T. C. Williams High School being named in his honor. “There’s no better honor than being validated by people who know you best. I will always, always treasure this.”

Lloyd and his wife, Charlita, had three sons and four grandchildren. Lloyd resided in Fairfield Glade, Tennessee, just outside Crossville, Tennessee, until his death on February 26, 2015.

Honors

 In 1993, Lloyd was inducted into the Virginia Sports Hall of Fame.
 Lloyd was inducted into the Central Intercollegiate Athletic Association (CIAA) Hall of Fame in 1998.
 The state of Virginia, proclaimed on February 9, 2001, as "Earl Lloyd Day" by action of Virginia's Governor.
 In 2003, Lloyd was inducted to the Naismith Memorial Basketball Hall of Fame as a contributor.
 Lloyd was named to the National Association of Intercollegiate Athletics Silver and Golden Anniversary Teams.
 The newly constructed basketball court at T. C. Williams High School in Lloyd's home town of Alexandria, Virginia, was named in his honor in 2007. Lloyd attended Parker-Gray High School, as Alexandria's schools were racially-segregated at the time. T.C. Williams—the subject of the motion picture Remember the Titans—was created as a combined, desegregated school two decades later.
 In November 2009, Moonfixer: The Basketball Journey of Earl Lloyd, was released. Lloyd wrote this biography with Syracuse area writer, Sean Kirst.
 In 2012, Lloyd was inducted into the Michigan Sports Hall of Fame.
 In 2014, a statue of Earl Lloyd was unveiled at West Virginia State University in the Walker Convocation Center. That same year, the "Earl Lloyd Classic" began, hosted at West Virginia State.
 In 2015 Lloyd, along with fellow basketball player Alonzo Mourning, was one of eight Virginians honored in the Library of Virginia's "Strong Men & Women in Virginia History" because of his contributions to the sport of basketball.
  In 2018, the road running in front of the Walker Convocation Center at West Virginia State University was renamed "Earl Lloyd Way."
  In 2022, the 200 block of Madison Street in the city of Syracuse was named "Earl Lloyd Way."

NBA career statistics

Regular season

Playoffs

Head coaching record

|-
|align="left"|Detroit
| align="left"|
| 70 || 20 || 50 ||  ||align="center"|6th in Midwest || – || – || – || 
| align="center"|Missed Playoffs
|-
|align="left"|Detroit
| align="left"|
| 7 || 2 || 5 ||  ||align="center"|(fired) || – || – || – || 
| align="center"|—
|- class="sortbottom"
| align="left"|Career
| || 77 || 22 || 55 ||  || || – || – || – ||  ||

See also

Race and ethnicity in the NBA
List of African-American firsts

References

Further reading

External links 

BasketballReference.com: Earl Lloyd (as coach)
BasketballReference.com: Earl Lloyd (as player)
Earl Lloyd's oral history video excerpts at The National Visionary Leadership Project
Biography of Earl Lloyd at the Library of Virginia's Strong Men & Women in Virginia History page

1928 births
2015 deaths
African-American basketball coaches
African-American basketball players
American men's basketball players
Basketball coaches from Virginia
Basketball players from Virginia
Detroit Pistons head coaches
Detroit Pistons players
Naismith Memorial Basketball Hall of Fame inductees
People from Crossville, Tennessee
Small forwards
Sportspeople from Alexandria, Virginia
Syracuse Nationals players
United States Army soldiers
Washington Capitols draft picks
Washington Capitols players
West Virginia State Yellow Jackets men's basketball players
20th-century African-American sportspeople
21st-century African-American people